Ihor Bohdanovych Shvets is a Ukrainian former professional footballer who played as a forward.

Career
A pupil of Ternopil football, he graduated from the Ternopil Children's and Youth Sports School. He began professional performances in Ternopil, which played in the second league and was the Niva's farm club, but in the summer of 2002 the club was disbanded and Shvets left the team.

Since 2003, he played for Borysfen Boryspil, which in the 2002–03 season helped to take second place in the first league and for the first time in history to reach the Premier League. In the elite division, Shvets made his debut on 19 June 2004, in a won match against Dnipro (1–0), but it was his only match of that season for the main team, and the rest of the time Shvets played for the Ukrainian Second League for Borysfen-2 Boryspil.

From the next season, Shvets began to be involved in the games of the main team, but the team took the last place and was eliminated from the Major League. However, six months later, at the beginning of 2006, Shvets returned to the Ukrainian Premier League, signing a contract with Vorskla Poltava. As part of it, he scored his debut goal in Ukrainian Premier League, on 5 November 2006, against Metalist, but in two years Shvets never became its main striker, having played only 17 matches in the Major League during this time.

From the beginning of 2008 until the end of the season, he played for the first-league Desna Chernihiv, after which he moved to Oleksandriya, which played in the same division, but did not play in its composition.

During the 2009–10 season he played for the first-league Enerhetyk Burshtyn, and in the next one for Arsenal Bila Tserkva.

In early 2012, he signed a contract with the second-league Poltava, which in the same season helped to reach the first league for the first time in history, after which he moved to the first-league Zirka Kropyvnytskyi.
However, even in the same offseason, having played only two matches for the Kirovograd club, he managed to move to Ternopil Niva.

In the first half of 2014 he played for Polish Stal (Sanok).

References

External links 
 Ihor Shvets footballfacts.ru
 Ihor Shvets allplayers.in.ua
 

1985 births
Living people
People from Berezhany
Ukrainian footballers
Association football forwards
FC Desna Chernihiv players
FC Enerhetyk Burshtyn players
FC Poltava players
FC Arsenal-Kyivshchyna Bila Tserkva players
FC Zirka Kropyvnytskyi players
Ukrainian Second League players
Ukrainian expatriate sportspeople in Poland
Expatriate footballers in Poland
Sportspeople from Ternopil Oblast